Herman Henry Taylor (December 6, 1877 – February 22, 1929) was a Republican politician from Idaho. He served as the 12th lieutenant governor of Idaho. Taylor was elected in 1913 along with  Governor John M. Haines. He was later elected in 1915 along with Democratic Governor Moses Alexander. He later served as a justice of the Idaho Supreme Court, from 1925 to 1929. He died of angina in 1929.

References

Idaho Republicans
Lieutenant Governors of Idaho
Justices of the Idaho Supreme Court
1877 births
1929 deaths